Charles Eugène de Foucauld de Pontbriand, Viscount of Foucauld (15 September 1858 – 1 December 1916) was a French soldier, explorer, geographer, ethnographer, Catholic priest and hermit who lived among the Tuareg people in the Sahara in Algeria. He was assassinated in 1916. His inspiration and writings led to the founding of the Little Brothers of Jesus among other religious congregations. He was canonized by Pope Francis in 2022.

Orphaned at the age of six, de Foucauld was brought up by his maternal grandfather, Colonel Beaudet de Morlet. He joined the Saint-Cyr Military Academy. Upon leaving the academy he opted to join the cavalry. He thus went to the Saumur Cavalry School, where he was known for his childish sense of humour, whilst living a life of debauchery enabled by an inheritance he received after his grandfather's death. He was assigned to the 4th Chasseurs d'Afrique Regiment. At the age of twenty-three, he decided to resign in order to explore Morocco by impersonating a Jew. The quality of his works earned him a gold medal from the Société de Géographie, as well as fame following publication of his book Reconnaissance au Maroc (1888).

Once back in France, he rekindled his Catholic faith and joined the Trappist order on 16 January 1890. Still with the Trappists, he then went to Syria. His quest of an even more radical ideal of poverty, altruism, and penitence, led him to leave the Trappists in order to become a hermit in 1897. He was then living in Palestine as a porter at convents of the Poor Clares in Nazareth and in Jerusalem, writing his meditations that became the cornerstone of his spirituality.

Ordained in Viviers in 1901, he decided to settle in the Algerian Sahara at Béni Abbès. His ambition was to form a new congregation, but nobody joined him. Taking the religious name "Brother Charles of Jesus", he lived with the Berbers, adopting a new apostolic approach, preaching not through sermons, but through his example. In order to become more familiar with the Tuareg, he studied their culture for over twelve years, using a pseudonym to publish the first Tuareg-French dictionary. He collected hundreds of Tuareg poems (paying a few sous to anyone who would bring poems to his hermitage) which he translated into French. He censored nothing in the poems, and never changed anything that might not conform to Catholic morality. De Foucauld's works are a reference point for the understanding of Tuareg culture.

On 1 December 1916, de Foucauld was assassinated at his hermitage. He was quickly considered to be a martyr of faith  and was the object of veneration following the success of the biography written by René Bazin (1923). New religious congregations, spiritual families, and a renewal of eremitic life are inspired by Charles de Foucauld's life and writings.

His beatification process started in 1927 eleven years after his death. He was declared Venerable on 24 April 2001 by Pope John Paul II, then Blessed on 13 November 2005 by Pope Benedict XVI. On 27 May 2020, the Vatican announced that a miracle had been attributed to de Foucauld's intercession. In his 2020 encyclical Fratelli tutti, Pope Francis wrote that "Blessed Charles directed his ideal of total surrender to God towards an identification with the poor, abandoned in the depths of the African desert. ... he expressed his desire to feel himself a brother to every human being, and asked a friend to 'pray to God that I truly be the brother of all'. He wanted to be, in the end, 'the universal brother'. Yet only by identifying with the least did he come at last to be the brother of all." De Foucauld was canonized as a saint by Pope Francis on 15 May 2022 in Rome.

Biography

Childhood 
De Foucauld's family was originally from the Périgord region of France and part of the old French nobility; their motto being Jamais arrière ("Never behind"). Several of his ancestors took part in the crusades, a source of prestige within the French nobility. His great-great-uncle, Armand de Foucauld de Pontbriand, a vicar general and first cousin of the archbishop of Arles, Monseigneur Jean Marie du Lau d'Allemans, as well as the archbishop himself, were victims of the September massacres that took place during the French Revolution. His mother, Élisabeth de Morlet, was from the Lorraine aristocracy whilst his grandfather had made a fortune during the revolution as a republican. Élisabeth de Morlet married the viscount Édouard de Foucauld de Pontbriand, a forest inspector, in 1855. On 17 July 1857, their first child Charles was born, and died one month later. Their second son, whom they named Charles Eugène, was born in Strasbourg on 15 September 1858 in the family house on Place Broglie at what was previously mayor Dietrich's mansion, where La Marseillaise was sung for the first time, in 1792.

A few months after his birth, his father was transferred to Wissembourg. In 1861, Charles was three and a half years old when his sister, Marie-Inès-Rodolphine, was born. His profoundly religious mother educated him in the Catholic faith, steeped in acts of devotion and piety. She died following miscarriage on 13 March 1864, followed by her husband who suffered from neurasthenia, on 9 August. The now orphaned Charles (age 6) and his sister Marie (age 3) were put in the care of their paternal grandmother, Viscountess Clothilde de Foucauld, who died of a heart attack shortly afterwards.

The children were then taken in by their maternal grandparents, Colonel Beaudet de Morlet and his wife, who lived in Strasbourg. De Morlet, an alumnus of the École Polytechnique and engineering officer, provided his grandchildren with an affectionate upbringing. Charles wrote of him: "My grandfather whose beautiful intelligence I admired, whose infinite tenderness surrounded my childhood and youth with an atmosphere of love, the warmth of which I still feel emotionally."

Charles pursued his studies at the Saint-Arbogast episcopal school, and went to Strasbourg high school in 1868. At the time an introvert and short-tempered, he was often ill and pursued his education thanks to private tuition.

He spent the summer of 1868 with his aunt, Inès Moitessier, who felt responsible for her nephew. Her daughter, Marie Moitessier (later Marie de Bondy), eight years older than Charles, became fast friends with him. She was a fervent churchgoer who was very close to Charles, sometimes acting as a maternal figure for him.

In 1870 the de Morlet family fled the Franco-Prussian War and found refuge in Bern. Following the French defeat, the family moved to Nancy in October 1871. Charles had four years of secular highschool left. Jules Duvaux was a teacher of his, and he bonded with fellow student Gabriel Tourdes. Both students had a passion for classical literature, and Gabriel remained, according to Charles, one of the "two incomparable friends" of his life. His education in a secular school developed nurtured patriotic sentiment, alongside a mistrust for the German Empire. His First Communion took place on 28 April 1872, and his confirmation at the hands of Monseigneur Joseph-Alfred Foulon in Nancy followed shortly thereafter.

In October 1873, when he was 15, whilst in a Rhetoric class, he began to distance himself from the faith before becoming agnostic. He later affirmed, "The philosophers are all in discord. I spent twelve years not denying and believing nothing, despairing of the truth, not even believing in God. No proof to me seemed evident." This loss of the faith was accompanied by uneasiness; Charles found himself to be "all selfishness, all impiousness, all evil desire, I was as though distraught".On 11 April 1874, his cousin Marie married Olivier de Bondy. A few months later, on 12 August 1874, Charles obtained his baccalauréat with the distinction "mention bien" (equivalent to magna cum laude).

 A dissipated youth 
Charles was sent to the Sainte-Geneviève school (now located in Versailles), run by the Jesuits, at that time located in the Latin Quarter of Paris, in order to prepare the admission test for the Saint-Cyr Military Academy. Charles was opposed to the strictness of the boarding school and decided to abandon all religious practice. He obtained his second baccalauréat in August 1875. He led a dissipated lifestyle at that point in time and was expelled from the school for being "lazy and undisciplined" in March 1876.

He then returned to Nancy, where he studied tutoring whilst secretly perusing light readings. During his readings with Gabriel Tourdes, he wanted to "completely enjoy that which is pleasant to the mind and body". This reading introduced the two students to the works of Aristotle, Voltaire, Erasmus, Rabelais and Laurence Sterne.

In June 1876, he applied for entrance to the Saint-Cyr Military Academy, and was accepted eighty-second out of four hundred and twelve. He was one of the youngest in his class. His record at Saint-Cyr was a mixed one and he graduated 333rd out of a class of 386.

The death of Foucauld's grandfather and the receipt of a substantial inheritance, was followed by his entry into the French cavalry school at Saumur. Continuing to lead an extravagant life style, Foucauld was posted to the 4th Regiment of Chasseurs d'Afrique in Algeria. Bored with garrison service he travelled in Morocco (1883–84), the Sahara (1885), and Palestine (1888–89). While reverting to being a wealthy young socialite when in Paris, Foucauld became an increasingly serious student of the geography and culture of Algeria and Morocco. In 1885 the Societe de Geographie de Paris awarded him its gold medal in recognition of his exploration and research.

 Religious life 
On 14 January 1890, de Foucauld entered the Trappist monastery of Notre-Dame des Neiges, where he received, as a novice, the religious name Marie-Albéric on the feast of this saint 26 January. According to a plea which he sent to the abbot prior to his entrance in Notre-Dame des Neiges, after some months of novitiate Br. Marie-Albéric was sent to the abbey of La Trappe at Akbès on the Syrian-Turkish border. But despite the strict life of the Trappists according to their vow of poverty, de Foucauld considered the life of the residents in the surrounding villages to be more miserable. In 1897, after seven years, he therefore left the order began to lead a life of prayer near a convent of Poor Clares in Nazareth where he worked as a porter and servant. After some time, it was suggested to him that he be ordained, so he returned to Akbès for some time in order to prepare for the ordination to the priesthood. On 9 June 1901, at the age of 43, he received the ordination in Viviers, France.

After that, he went to the Sahara in French Algeria and continued to live an heremitical lifestyle. At that time he adopted the religious name Charles of Jesus. He first settled in Béni Abbès, near the Moroccan border, building a small hermitage for "adoration and hospitality", which he soon referred to as the "fraternity" and both himself and the future members as "little brothers" of Jesus.

De Foucauld moved to be with the Tuareg people, in Tamanghasset in southern Algeria. This region is the central part of the Sahara with the Ahaggar Mountains (the Hoggar) immediately to the west. Foucauld used the highest point in the region, the Assekrem, as a place of retreat. Living close to the Tuareg and sharing their life and hardships, he made a ten-year study of their language and cultural traditions. He learned the Tuareg language and worked on a dictionary and grammar. His dictionary manuscript was published posthumously in four volumes and has become known among Berberologists for its rich and apt descriptions.

Death

On 1 December 1916, de Foucauld was dragged from his hermitage by a group of tribal raiders led by El Madani ag Soba, who was connected with the Senussi Bedouin. They intended to kidnap de Foucauld. However they were interrupted by two Méharistes of the French Camel Corps. One startled bandit (15-year-old Sermi ag Thora) shot de Foucauld through the head, killing him instantly. The Méharistes were also shot dead. The murder was witnessed by sacristan and servant Paul Embarek, an African Arab former slave liberated and instructed by de Foucauld.

The French authorities continued for years searching for the bandits involved. In 1943 El Madani fled French forces in Libya to the remote South Fezzan. Sermi ag Thora was apprehended and executed at Djanet in 1944.

In April 1929, the mortal remains of Charles de Foucauld were transferred to the oasis of El Meniaa to a tomb in the cemetery near the local parish of St. Joseph.

Veneration
De Foucauld was beatified by Cardinal José Saraiva Martins on 13 November 2005, on behalf of Pope Benedict XVI.

On 27 May 2020, Pope Francis issued a decree which approved a second miracle clearing the way for de Foucauld to be canonized. On 4 March 2022, a papal consistory opened the way for the canonization and set the date for the canonization ceremony to 15 May 2022, together with a number of others including Titus Brandsma. His feast is on 1 December, the liturgical colour is white.

Religious communities inspired by de Foucauld
De Foucauld inspired and helped to organize a confraternity within France in support of his ideas. This organization, the Association of the Brothers and Sisters of the Sacred Heart of Jesus, consisted of 48 lay and ordained members at the time of his death. Members of this group, notably Louis Massignon, a scholar of Islam, and René Bazin, author of a biography, La Vie de Charles de Foucauld Explorateur en Maroc, Ermite du Sahara (1923), kept his memory alive and inspired the family of lay and religious fraternities. Though French in origin, these groups have expanded to include many cultures and their languages on every populated continent. The Charles de Foucauld Spiritual Family Association brings together the Little Brothers of Jesus, the Little Sisters of Jesus and 18 other religious orders and associations for priests, religious and laypeople which were inspired by him.

 Legacy 
The 1936 French film The Call of Silence depicted his life.

In 1950, the colonial Algerian government issued a postage stamp with his image. The French government did the same in 1959.

In 1959 Dupuis published a comic book about the life of Charles de Foucauld, art and text by the Belgian comic artist Jijé (Joseph Gillain), who also made comic books about other saints, like Bernadette Soubirous and Don Bosco.

Antonello Padovano wrote and directed the film "The Four Doors of the Desert" based on Charles de Foucauld life and his friendship with the Tuareg Amenokal Moussa Ag Amastan.

Charles de Foucauld is honored in the Church of England and in the Episcopal Church on 1 December.

Works
 Reconnaissance au Maroc, 1883–1884. 4 vols. Paris: Challamel, 1888.
 Dictionnaire Touareg–Français, Dialecte de l'Ahaggar. 4 vols. Paris: Imprimerie nationale de France, 1951–1952.
 Poésies Touarègues. Dialecte de l'Ahaggar. 2 vols. Paris: Leroux, 1925–1930.

 Notes 

References

Further reading

 Casajus, Dominique (1997). "Charles de Foucauld et les Touaregs, Rencontre et Malentendu". Terrain 28: 29–42.
 Casajus, Dominique (2009). Charles de Foucauld: Moine et Savant. CNRS Éditions. .
 Chatelard, Antoine (2000). La Mort de Charles de Foucauld. Karthala Editions. .
 Fournier, Josette (2007). Charles de Foucauld: Amitiés Croisées. Éditions Cheminements. .
Fremantle, Anne (1950). Desert Calling. The Story of Charles de Foucauld. London, Hollis & Carter.
Galand, Lionel (1999). Lettres au Marabout. Messages Touaregs au Père de Foucauld. Paris, Belin, 1999.
 Hallier, Jean-Edern, L'Evangile du fou: Charles de Foucauld, le manuscrit de ma mère morte, Paris, Albin Michel, 1986
 Levaye, Patrick (December 2016). Charles de Foucauld, Repères pour Aujourd'hui, Première Partie Editions
Wright, Cathy (2005). Charles de Foucauld – Journey of the Spirit''. Pauline Books and Media. .

External links

Lay Fraternity , Lay Fraternity Page
Facebook Group, Brother Charles' Facebook page
Lay Fraternity in Canada, Canadian Lay Fraternity Page
Association Famille Spirituelle Charles de Foucauld (Spiritual Family of Charles de Foucauld)
Názáret, a Hungarian website about Charles de Foucauld and his spirituality
"Charles de Foucauld"  at Jesus Caritas
"Books by or about Charles de Foucauld"  at Jesus Caritas
 
An "Insight" episode based on Charles de Foucauld, portrayed by Efrem Zimbalist, Jr.

1858 births
1916 deaths
19th-century Christian mystics
19th-century explorers
20th-century Christian mystics
20th-century Roman Catholic martyrs
20th-century French Roman Catholic priests
20th-century venerated Christians
Beatifications by Pope Benedict XVI
Canonizations by Pope Francis
Deaths by firearm in Algeria
École Spéciale Militaire de Saint-Cyr alumni
Explorers of Africa
Founders of Catholic religious communities
French Army officers
French beatified people
French explorers
French hermits
French Christian mystics
French Roman Catholic missionaries
French people murdered abroad
History of the Sahara
People murdered in Algeria
Clergy from Strasbourg
Roman Catholic missionaries in Algeria
Roman Catholic mystics
Venerated Catholics by Pope John Paul II
Anglican saints
Military personnel from Strasbourg